Ploot may refer to:
 "Ploot", an episode of Lilo & Stitch: The Series
 Ploot, a character in the above episode.
 PLOOT, a codename for a reflex camera housing from Leica Camera 
 Ploot, one of the alien characters "Toot and Ploot" used in advertising for Butlins

See also
 Plute (disambiguation)
 Pluot
 Plot (disambiguation)